Claude Weston Miller  (b 26 June 1944) was the ninth Anglican Archbishop of Fredericton and  Metropolitan of Canada. He retired on June 26, 2014 upon reaching his 70th birthday, and accepted the exceptional appointment as Episcopal Administrator until his successor, David Edwards, was consecrated as Bishop on September 20, 2014.

Miller was born in New Brunswick and worked in civil engineering until his calling to the priesthood. He was ordained in 1988, rising to the rank of Archdeacon by 2000. He and his wife Sharon have two daughters.

References

Anglican bishops of Fredericton
21st-century Anglican Church of Canada bishops
21st-century Anglican archbishops
Metropolitans of Canada
1944 births
Living people